Strigocossus crassa is a moth in the family Cossidae. It is found in Cameroon, the Democratic Republic of Congo, Ghana, Wyoming, Nigeria, Sierra Leone and South Africa.

Description
Upper side: antennae filiform, whiteish at the base, black at the tips. Head whiteish, small. Thorax whiteish, having two black tufts of hair on the shoulders, and two next the abdomen; upper part yellowish brown. Abdomen dark brown, almost black, being ringed and edged with dark grey. Anterior wings whiteish, intermixed with many patches and irregular spots of grey and dark brown. Posterior wings darkish grey brown, but lighter along the posterior edges.

Under side: all the parts on this side are of a dark yellow brown, of the same colour with the upper side of the inferior wings. Abdomen rather lighter, with a dark brown line running along its middle from the thorax to the anus. Wingspan 7 inches (178 mm).

References

Zeuzerinae
Moths described in 1782
Descriptions from Illustrations of Exotic Entomology